Bernay is a commune in the west of the Eure department in Northern France.

In 2012, Bernay was designated one of the French Towns and Lands of Art and History.

Geography
The city is on the border of the Pays d'Ouche and the Lieuvin. Bernay station has rail connections to Caen, Évreux, Paris, Rouen, Deauville and Lisieux.

History
The name Bernay is rooted in 5th century Roman settlement Brinnacu, from the Latin Brinnacum ("braided"), reflecting the marshy braided river land that the original settlement was built on. The city has expanded around the River Charentonne, shielded by the incline to highlands ("les Monts") at the top of the Charentonne valley. The town has grown to encompass a portion of the smaller Cosnier, a tributary of the Charentonne.

Between 996 and 1008, Duke of Normandy Richard II offered this area in dowry to his wife, Judith of Brittany, who then provided for the building of a Benedictine abbey. The monks used the rivers flowing through the area for industry, for example cleansing, mills and fisheries. The abbey still stands, an example of Norman Romanesque architecture. To cover their expenses and to assure their protection, the monks yielded a part of the property in 1048. The veneration of "Notre-Dame de la Couture" (13th century) is the starting-point of important pilgrimages, which attract people from across Normandy; the diocesan Marian pilgrimage still takes place each Whit Monday.

The town is known for its cloth industry. Because of the diversity and abundance of the agricultural produce of the area, the town has a history of hosting market fairs, such as the "Foire Fleurie" each Palm Sunday. Bernay holds a large street market each Saturday, which takes over much of the old part of the town.

During the 19th century, when the road system was modernized, most industrial development moved to the outskirts of the town. During the 20th century, the arrival of new industries continued the outward expansion of Bernay, which now includes the slopes overlooking the historical city centre, which has maintained many of its original buildings.

In August 1944, during World War II, the First Canadian Army advanced east towards the Seine following the successful Operation Tractable. The Canadians liberated Bernay, which escaped damage from the Canadian bombardment of the area thanks to a thick layer of cloud, thus preserving the historical city centre.

Population

People
Romuald Boco, soccer player
Edith Piaf, singer, lived with Bernay-based grandmother shortly after her birth 
Olivier Picard, archaeologist

Sister cities
Bernay has four international sister cities:
 Haslemere
Cloppenburg
Jennings, Louisiana
Canal Winchester, Ohio

See also
Communes of the Eure department

References

Communes of Eure
Subprefectures in France